A literary society is a group of people interested in literature. Often this refers to a society that wants to promote one genre of literature,  e.g. the World Science Fiction Society, or a specific writer—see, for example, the list of poetry groups and movements.  Such societies typically engage in research about their chosen author or genre, publishing a newsletter and holding meetings to deliver papers.  Many are overtly academic and scholarly.

Some are more social groups of individuals who appreciate a chance to discuss literature and the arts, or their favorite writer with others.

American literary societies

American literary societies associated with colleges or universities

Australian literary societies

International Societies
 Medieval Chronicle Society
 Literary and Debating Society (NUI Galway)

References